Stara Gora is a small settlement in the Municipality of Sveti Jurij ob Ščavnici in northeastern Slovenia. It lies on a small hill just south of the Ščavnica Valley. The area is part of the traditional region of Styria and is now included in the Mura Statistical Region.

The village church is dedicated to the Holy Spirit and belongs to the Parish of Sveti Jurij ob Ščavnici. It was built between  1674 and 1697.

References

External links

Stara Gora at Geopedia

Populated places in the Municipality of Sveti Jurij ob Ščavnici